The 2022 Liga 3 East Nusa Tenggara or 2022 El Tari Memorial Cup XXXI is the fourth season of Liga 3 Zone East Nusa Tenggara organized by Asprov PSSI NTT.

Followed by 24 clubs. The winner of this competition will advance to the national round.

PS Malaka is the defending champion after winning it in the 2019.

Teams 
2022 Liga 3 East Nusa Tenggara was attended by 24 teams.

Venues 
Gelora 99 Stadium, Lembata Regency
Polres Lembata Field, Lembata Regency

Group stage

Group A

Group B

Group C

Group D

Group E

Group F

Ranking of third place

Knockout stage

Awards

References 

Liga 3
Liga 3 (Indonesia)
Sport in East Nusa Tenggara